Adriana Leal da Silva (born 17 November 1996), commonly known as Adriana or Maga, is a Brazilian professional footballer who plays as a forward for Orlando Pride of the National Women's Soccer League (NWSL) and the Brazil women's national team.

Club career
Adriana was born in União, Piauí and played for Tiradentes in the State and Brazilian championships. In 2016 she was hired by Rio Preto, as a replacement for Darlene de Souza.
 
Adriana scored as Corinthians won the 2018 Campeonato Brasileiro de Futebol Feminino, beating her former club Rio Preto 5–0 on aggregate in the final. Her 14 league goals made her the second highest goal scorer and she was named 2018 Prêmio Craque do Brasileirão.

On 19 January 2023, Adriana signed a three-year contract with Orlando Pride of the American National Women's Soccer League (NWSL).

International career

In October 2017, Adriana won her first cap for the senior Brazil women's national football team at the 2017 Yongchuan International Tournament, appearing as a substitute for Gabi Zanotti in a 3–0 win over Mexico. Five days later she scored her first national team goal in a 2–2 draw with hosts China.

Adriana featured at the 2018 Tournament of Nations, but had been left out of the final 22-player roster for the 2018 Copa América Femenina. She was called up again for two friendlies with Canada in September 2018.

Brazil's final 23-player squad for the 2019 FIFA Women's World Cup was announced on 16 May 2019. Adriana was included but she had to be replaced by Luana the following day, due to a knee ligament injury.

Career statistics

Club summary

International
Statistics accurate as of match played 22 February 2023.

International goals
 As of match played 10 October 2022. Brazil score listed first, score column indicates score after each Adriana goal.

Honors
Rio Preto
Campeonato Paulista: 2016, 2017

Corinthians
Campeonato Brasileiro Série A1: 2018, 2020, 2021, 2022
Campeonato Paulista: 2019, 2020, 2021
Copa Libertadores: 2019, 2021
Supercopa do Brasil: 2022

Brazil
Yongchuan International Tournament: 2017
Torneio Internacional de Futebol: 2021
Copa América: 2022

References

External links
 
 Profile at Sport Club Corinthians Paulista 
 N3 Sports agency profile 

1996 births
Living people
Brazilian women's footballers
Brazil women's international footballers
Sportspeople from Piauí
Women's association football forwards
Sport Club Corinthians Paulista (women) players
Orlando Pride players